At the 1932 Winter Olympics one individual ski jumping event was contested. It was held on Friday, February 12, 1932.

Medalists

Results

The competition took place at "Intervales Hill" with a K-Point of 61 meters.

Participating nations
A total of 34 ski jumpers from ten nations competed at the Lake Placid Games:

References

External links
International Olympic Committee results database
Official Olympic Report
sports-reference
 

 
1932 Winter Olympics events
1932
1932 in ski jumping
Ski jumping competitions in the United States